More Sounds of Christmas is an album of Christmas music by Ramsey Lewis' Trio featuring tracks recorded in 1964 and released on the Argo label. The album is Lewis' second Christmas album following Sound of Christmas (Argo, 1961).

Reception

Allmusic awarded the album 4 stars, stating, "Again hampered by strings on too many cuts, on the plus side, this does contain the ultra-cool original, 'Eggnog,' featuring Lewis on celeste".

Track listing
 "Snowbound" (Clarence Kehner, Russell Faith) – 3:37   
 "The Twelve Days of Christmas" (Traditional) – 2:43   
 "Egg Nog" (Ramsey Lewis) – 3:28   
 "Rudolph the Red-Nosed Reindeer" (Johnny Marks) – 2:30   
 "Jingle Bells" (James Pierpont) – 2:33   
 "Plum Puddin (Eldee Young) – 2:58   
 "Snowfall" (Claude Thornhill) – 2:08   
 "We Three Kings" (John Henry Hopkins, Jr.) – 4:01   
 "White Christmas" (Irving Berlin) – 4:22   
 "The Little Drummer Boy" (Katherine Kennicott Davis, Harry Simeone, Henry Onorati) – 2:26

Personnel 
Ramsey Lewis – piano, celeste
El Dee Young – bass, cello
Isaac "Red" Holt (tracks 1, 2, 4, 7 & 10), Steve McCall (tracks 3, 5, 6, 8 & 9) – drums
Cleveland Eaton – bass (track 5)
Abe Meltzer, Albert Muenzer, David Chausow, Everett Zlatoff-Mirsky, Harold Kupper, Harold Newton, Henry Ferber, Irving Kaplan, Mark Konrad, Sol A. Bobrov, Theodore Ratzer – string section (tracks 1, 2, 4, 7 & 10)
Peter Eagle – harp (tracks 1, 2, 4, 7 & 10)
John Avant – trombone (tracks 1, 2, 4, 7 & 10)
King Fleming, Will Jackson – arranger (tracks 1, 2, 4, 7 & 10)

References 

1964 Christmas albums
Christmas albums by American artists
Ramsey Lewis albums
Argo Records albums
Albums produced by Esmond Edwards
Jazz Christmas albums